Johan Rabaeus (born Carl Magnus Olof Johan Rabéus 31 July 1947) is a Swedish actor who was born in Stockholm but grew up in Paris and Geneva.

He is known for portraying very unpleasant characters, such as Erik Ponti's sadistic stepfather in the film Evil (2003). He participated in Let's Dance 2016 which was broadcast on TV4.

Selected filmography
1988: S.O.S. – En segelsällskapsresa
1990: The Rabbit Man
1993: Lotta flyttar hemifrån
1995: Sommaren (The Summer)
1996: Jerusalem
1998: Beck – Öga för öga (Beck – An Eye for an Eye)
2000: Faithless (Swedish title: Trolösa)
2000: The Dog Hotel
2000: Jönssonligan spelar högt (The Johnson Gang Plays High)
2003: Evil (Swedish title: Ondskan)
2005: Kinamand
2006: Heartbreak Hotel
2010: Bröderna Karlsson
2011: Åsa-Nisse – wälkom to Knohult
2014: Tommy
2018: Greyzone

References

External links

Johan Rabaeus on the Royal Dramatic Theatre's website

Johan Rabaeus on Stockholm City Theatre's website

1947 births
Living people
Male actors from Stockholm
Swedish male film actors
Litteris et Artibus recipients
20th-century Swedish male actors
21st-century Swedish male actors
Melodifestivalen contestants of 2013